This is a list of 216 species in the genus Deraeocoris.

Deraeocoris species

References

Deraeocoris